= Wadi-jaitapur =

Village in Maharashtra

Coordinates: 17.7940°N 73.5007°E

Wadi-jaitapur is a small village in Ratnagiri district, Maharashtra state in Western India. The 2011 census of India recorded a total of 289 residents in the village. Wadi-jaitapur's geographical area is approximately 198 hectares (490 acres).
